Tsolli may refer to several placesin Estonia:

Tsolli, Rõuge Parish, village in Rõuge Parish, Võru County
Tsolli, Võru Parish, village in Võru Parish, Võru County